Miracles Still Happen is a 1974 Italian film directed by Giuseppe Maria Scotese. It features the story of Juliane Diller, the sole survivor of 92 passengers and crew, in the 24 December 1971 crash of LANSA Flight 508 in the Peruvian rainforest.

Cast 
 Susan Penhaligon as Juliane Koepcke
 Paul Muller as Hans-Wilhelm Koepcke
 Graziella Galvani as Maria Koepcke

Production 
Filmed on location in Peru (exterior scenes) and in Rome, Italy at Cinecittà Studios (interior scenes) on a 12-week shooting schedule from October 9 to December 28, 1972.

See also 
 Wings of Hope
 The One, similar story about Aeroflot Flight 811

References

External links 
 

1974 films
1974 drama films
Italian aviation films
Disaster films based on actual events
Drama films based on actual events
Films about aviation accidents or incidents
Films set in 1971
Italian disaster films
Italian drama films
English-language Italian films
Survival films
Films directed by Giuseppe Maria Scotese
Films scored by Marcello Giombini
1970s disaster films
1970s English-language films
1970s Italian films